Taekwondo was introduced to the Philippines through the efforts of Kim Bok Man and Young Man Park. Grand Master Kim Bok Man arrived in 1970 to continue Park's legacy of propagating Taekwondo upon the invitation of President Marcos. Kim continued to pioneer Taekwondo worldwide and left the Philippines in 1971. In 1975, Grand Master Hong Sung-chon came to the Philippines to promote Taekwondo, eventually establishing the Philippine Taekwondo Association (PTA). The current central headquarters of the PTA is at the Rizal Memorial Sports Complex. The PTA is a member of the Kukkiwon, World Taekwondo Federation, Philippine Sports Commission, Philippine Olympic Committee and Asian Taekwondo Union.

Terminology

Kicks
In the Philippines, different names are used for the following kicks.
Forty-five – a roundhouse kick to the torso
Turning-side – pivoting on the front leg or ball of the foot and executing a back kick
Full-moon – hook kick
In-out – crescent kick, raising the leg diagonally across the body moving outwards
Out-in – crescent kick, coming from the outside landing on the inside.
Stepping-side – taking a step and executing a side kick
Bullet – rapid succession of alternate forty-five kicks
Turning-long – tornado kick, dragon's whip kick, spin hook kick
Jumping turning forty-five – forward jump twist then executing a forty-five in midair
Jumping out-in
Jumping axe kick
Jumping turning out-in
Jumping turning-long – jump spin hook kick
Asian Turning Long – forward jump twist at the same time or slightly after, from the rear, executing a forty-five in midair or fake/feigning forty-five then turning long or spin kick

Color of belts
 Black belt (1st to 9th dan black belt)
 Brown belt (2nd grade and 1st grade brown) – Taeguk 7 and 8
 Red belt (4th grade and 3rd grade red) – Taeguk 5 and 6
 Blue belt (6th grade and 5th grade blue) – Taeguk 3 and 4
 Yellow belt (8th grade and 7th grade yellow) – Taeguk 1 and 2
 White belt – foundation form No. 1 and 2

Notable taekwondo martial artists

Pioneers
Paul Cabatingan – first batch member and organizer of Taekwondo Blackbelt Brotherhood (TBB)
Arch. Elmer Pato – chair of Eljan Ventures Inc. (first professional manufacturer of taekwondo apparel in the Philippines); bronze medalist at 1976 Asian Championships in Melbourne, Australia
Monsour del Rosario
Col. Jeff Tamayo – silver medalist in 1982; coach to Bea Lucero and Ali Atienza; military colonel
Jaime "Jimmy" Martin – member of the first Philippine national taekwondo team. Bronze medalist at World Taekwondo Championships, two-time bronze medalist at 1974 and 1976 Asian Taekwondo Championships. Member of the Taekwondo Blackbelt Brotherhood (TBB).
Roland Campos – international referee
Juanito "Jojo" Ron
Joseph Bismark
Harvey Campos – management mentor and tutor

Others 
Robert "Bobby" Vargas – first Filipino to garner the silver medal at the Asian Games in Hiroshima
Ricardo Santiago Jr – international referee and current PTA referee chairman
Roberto "Kitoy" Cruz – three-time silver medalist at 1995, 1997 and 1999 World Taekwondo Championships, bronze medalist at 2001 World Taekwondo Championships, bronze medalist at World Cup Taekwondo Championships, gold medalist at 1999 2nd Asian Olympic Qualifying Tournament, two-time silver medalist at 1994, 1996 Asian Taekwondo Championships, six-time gold medalist at South East Asian Games
Tshomlee Go
Manel Sy – five-time SEA Games gold medalist, bronze medallist Bangkok Asian Games and coach of the head hunters merville
Stephen Fernandez – bronze medalist of the 1992 Barcelona Olympics and current Deputy Secretary General of the Philippine Taekwondo Association
Beatriz Lucero – representative to the Olympics in gymnastics
Eva Marie M. Ditan – World Cup silver and bronze medalist
John Paul "Japoy" Lizardo actor and Philippine representative
Arnold Baradi – first Filipino gold medal winner in the Asian Taekwondo Games
Ali Atienza – second Filipino to win a gold medal in the Asian Taekwondo Games and son of former mayor Lito Atienza
Alvin Taraya – first Filipino to win medals (silver and bronze) in the Taekwondo World Cup, SEA Games gold medalist
Mary Antoinette Rivero
Grace Poe Llamanzares – senator
Benigno Aquino III – president
Jamby Madrigal – former senator
Juan Ponce Enrile
Igor Mella – Philippine taekwondo national team coach
Kirstie Elaine Alora – taekwondo Olympics Representative
MH Farro
Melvin D. Morte – first Filipino WT international referee to officiate in both Kyorugi and Poomsae in the 2018 Asian Games held in Jakarta, Indonesia

See also
NCAA Taekwondo Championship
UAAP Taekwondo Championship
Taekwondo at the 2005 Southeast Asian Games

References

External sources
Results of the Asian Taekwondo Championships